Die Glatzkopfbande is an East German film. It was released in 1963.

External links
 

1963 films
East German films
1960s German-language films
Films directed by Richard Groschopp
1960s German films